Wenchang Subdistrict is a subdistrict and the seat of Dongkou County in Hunan, China. It was one of three subdistricts established in July 2015. The subdistrict of Wenchang  has 9 villages and 5 communities under its jurisdiction.

History
The subdistrict was formed from 12 communities and 6 villages of the former Dongkou Town in July 2015.

Subdivisions
The subdistrict of Wenchang has 5 communities and 9 villages under its jurisdiction.

5 communities
 Bajiaotian Community
 Huashan Community
 Jucheng Community
 Longshan Community
 Wenchang Community

9 communities
 Daqiao Village
 Gaodu Village
 Jinwu Village
 Pingdong Village
 Pingdu Village
 Pingqing Village
 Shucai Village
 Xinping Village
 Zhushan Village

References

Dongkou
County seats in Hunan